Julius Eugen Schlossberger (31 May 1819, in Stuttgart – 9 July 1860, in Tübingen), also spelled Julius Eugen Schloßberger, was a German physician and biochemist. He was a student of Justus von Liebig and was one of the leading physiological chemists in his lifetime.

Biography

He obtained his doctorate in medicine and surgery (Dr. med. et chir.) at the age of 21, and worked at St. Catherine's Hospital in Stuttgart and as the private physician of a count, before he continued his studies in Vienna, Paris and Giessen. In Giessen, he came under the influence and patronage of Liebig, who introduced him to the field of physiological chemistry. From 1845, he worked at the chemical laboratory of William Gregory (himself a student of Liebig) at the University of Edinburgh, before he became professor at the University of Tübingen.

He published several works analysing and summarising different physiological subfields, and on the chemical composition of body tissues such as muscles (creatine), brain tissue, breast milk, respiration, food chemistry, pathobiochemical investigations, and also purely chemical analyses. He also published a textbook on organic chemistry in 1850, titled Lehrbuch der organischen Chemie.

He was the grandfather of the immunologist Hans Schlossberger.

References

German biochemists
19th-century German physicians
Academic staff of the University of Tübingen
Academics of the University of Edinburgh
University of Tübingen alumni
Physicians from Stuttgart
1819 births
1860 deaths